"The Meaning of Love" is a song by English electronic music band Depeche Mode from their second studio album, A Broken Frame (1982). It was released on 26 April 1982 as the album's second single.

Background
The single version of "The Meaning of Love" is the same as the album version from A Broken Frame. The "Fairly Odd Mix" is an extended version with electronic experimentation added to the original mix.

The B-side is "Oberkorn (It's a Small Town)", an atmospheric instrumental written by Martin Gore as an intro for the A Broken Frame Tour, in the town of Oberkorn, Luxembourg. A longer version called the "Development Mix" features an ambient intro followed by the original song, and afterwards has a new arrangement of music.

The video for "The Meaning of Love" was the second video with Alan Wilder, although he did not contribute to the song. The director was Julien Temple. The video was not included on the Some Great Videos VHS compilation because it was not well-liked by the band.

The single was not released in the United States, but the 12" "Fairly Odd Mix" of the song features on the B-side of the "See You" US 12" single.

Track listings
7": Mute / 7Mute22 (UK)
 "The Meaning of Love " – 3:05
 "Oberkorn (It's a Small Town)" – 4:07

12": Mute / 12Mute22 (UK)
 "The Meaning of Love (Fairly Odd Mix)" – 4:59
 "Oberkorn (It's a Small Town) (Development Mix)" – 7:37

CD: Mute / CDMute22 (UK)1 
 "The Meaning of Love " – 3:05
 "Oberkorn (It's a Small Town)" – 4:07
 "The Meaning of Love (Fairly Odd Mix)" – 4:59
 "Oberkorn (It's a Small Town) (Development Mix)" – 7:37

CD: Sire / 40293-2 (US)1 
 "The Meaning of Love " – 3:05
 "Oberkorn (It's a Small Town)" – 4:07
 "The Meaning of Love (Fairly Odd Mix)" – 4:59
 "Oberkorn (It's a Small Town) (Development Mix)" – 7:37

Notes
1: CD released in 1991

Charts

References

External links
 Single information from the official Depeche Mode web site
 AllMusic review 

1982 singles
1982 songs
Depeche Mode songs
Music videos directed by Julien Temple
Mute Records singles
Song recordings produced by Daniel Miller
Songs written by Martin Gore